Nadia Ayelen  Bordon (born 11 August 1988) is an Argentinian handball goalkeeper for CA Lanús and the Argentina national team.

She represented Argentina at the 2013 World Women's Handball Championship in Serbia.

References

Argentine female handball players
1988 births
Living people
Expatriate handball players
Argentine expatriate sportspeople in Italy
South American Games silver medalists for Argentina
South American Games medalists in handball
Competitors at the 2018 South American Games
Handball players at the 2019 Pan American Games
Pan American Games medalists in handball
Pan American Games silver medalists for Argentina
Medalists at the 2019 Pan American Games
20th-century Argentine women
21st-century Argentine women